Mahi Kur Cave is a cave located in Lorestan province in Papi district, near a village called Levan. This cave is the only national natural monument of Lorestan province and was registered in 2006. There are two rare and unique specimens of blind fish in this cave that have not been found anywhere else in the world. These fish have no eyesight and are completely blind. They do not have any traces of outside eyes and are known as Garra typhlops since they live in groundwater and in dark caves.

The discovery of Mahi Kur Cave 
In 1930, two Danish naturalists came to Papi district with the executors of the Tehran-South Railway project. After investigating the tributaries of the Sirom River and Kairud Stream, they arrived at a water hole near the village of Levan and encountered with a type of blind fish. They took several specimens of the blind fish to their country and registered them as "Iranocypris" and apparently refuse to reveal the location of the fish.

On June 17, 1951, the research and exploration team of an English researcher named Anthony John Smith from Oxford University traveled to Iran to the city of Kerman to discover the location of the blind fish. But after three months he returned to England with no result. Twenty-six years later he realized the fish he was looking for is not in Kerman's aqueducts and is in the Zagros Mountains.

In 1977, following the Danes paths of discovery, he traveled to the Papi district in Lorestan province and succeeded in discovering the location of the blind fish and took some samples of them with him to England. Among the fish that Smith took on his second trip to England is an example similar to the one previously discovered by the Danes and registered under the name Iranocypris. But the second type of fish discovered by Smith, was unknown and rare therefore the name of the blind fish was registered under the name "Paracobits smithi".

After a few years, for the third time Anthony Smith returned to Iran with an excellent diving team and digs deeper into the water inside the cave and managed to find a number of other blind fish. It seems that Smith did not announce any location of this cave and only mentions it in a book he later wrote entitled "The Blind White Fish of Iran".

Characteristics of blind fish in Mahi Kur 
The home of this blind fish is in groundwater.  Since the mouth of Mahi Kur cave is connected to the surface of the groundwater, it makes it possible for the blind fish to come close to the surface of the water during the nights. They are only seen during the hot days of the year near the earth's surface of water. The fish lives in the water temperature from 5 to 28 degrees Celsius.

First specimen 
The blind fish of the blind Persian cave, with the scientific name "Iranocypris typhlops" belongs to the common carp family. This type, which is 4 to 5 cm long, has two pairs of whiskers, one pair on the upper lip and the other pair in the corner of the mouth. The head of this fish is somewhat wide, and no external traces of the eye can be seen. The color of the fish is pink and there are a few scales on the back of the pectoral fin. The pharyngeal teeth are double-rowed and conical.

Second specimen 
The blind fish with the scientific name of "Paracobits smithi" belongs to the stream of the Nemacheilus family. This type of fish, in addition to being deprived of eyes, does not have pigments or scales. It has three pairs of whiskers, the second pair of which grows well and reaches the end of the third pair. The average body length is reported to be 45 mm.

Scientific and research value of blind fish 
Blind fish have no economic value in terms of fisheries, but as sources of rare genetic resources, they have been evaluated and studied in many research institutes or seen as amazing and beautiful ornamental fish in wildlife museums and aquariums.

The Access Path 
Mahi Kur Cave is accessible both by road and by rail. Among the trains going to Lorestan, only the "normal" train of Tehran-Ahvaz and the "local" train of Doroud-Andimeshk stop at Tang-e haft station. Then from this station you have to walk to the north (parallel to the Caesar River) to the Sirom Bridge and then from there to the west (towards the villages of Levan and Lolri) until after about four hours of walking, you will reach the village of Levan and Mahi Kur Cave.

References 

Caves of Iran
Show caves in Iran